Makinton Dorleant (born October 6, 1992) is a former gridiron football cornerback. He played college football at Northern Iowa. Dorleant was signed by the Green Bay Packers as an undrafted free agent in 2016.

College career
Dorleant attended The University of Northern Iowa, where he played for coach Mark Farley's Northern Iowa Panthers football team from 2013 to 2015 after transferring from The University of Maryland.

Statistics

Professional career

Green Bay Packers
After going undrafted in the 2016 NFL Draft, Dorleant signed with the Green Bay Packers on May 6, 2016. On September 5, 2016, he was placed on injured reserve. On December 3, 2016, he was activated off injured reserve prior to Week 13. After getting injured against the Detroit Lions in the last game of the season, Dorleant was placed back on injured reserve on January 4, 2017.

On April 11, 2017, Dorleant was released by the Packers after failing a physical.

Kansas City Chiefs
On January 3, 2018, Dorleant signed a reserve/future contract with the Kansas City Chiefs. He was waived on September 1, 2018.

Baltimore Ravens
On September 19, 2018, Dorleant was signed to the Baltimore Ravens' practice squad. He was released on November 14, 2018.

Oakland Raiders
On December 27, 2018, Dorleant was signed to the Oakland Raiders practice squad.

Dorleant signed a reserve/future contract with the Raiders on January 1, 2019. He was waived on June 11, 2019, but was re-signed on August 13, 2019. He was waived/injured during final roster cuts on August 30, 2019, and reverted to the team's injured reserve list on September 1.

Winnipeg Blue Bombers
Dorleant signed with the Winnipeg Blue Bombers of the CFL on July 3, 2020. After the CFL canceled the 2020 season due to the COVID-19 pandemic, Dorleant chose to opt-out of his contract with the Blue Bombers on August 26, 2020.

References

External links
 Green Bay Packers bio
 Northern Iowa Panthers bio
 Maryland Terrapins bio
 

1992 births
Living people
Players of American football from Florida
Sportspeople from Naples, Florida
American football cornerbacks
Maryland Terrapins football players
Northern Iowa Panthers football players
Green Bay Packers players
Kansas City Chiefs players
Baltimore Ravens players
Oakland Raiders players
Winnipeg Blue Bombers players